Opper may refer to:

Bernard Opper (1915–2000), American basketball player
Clarence V. Opper (1897–1964), United States Tax Court judge
Don Keith Opper (born 1949), American actor, writer, and producer
Frederick Burr Opper (1857–1937), American cartoonist
Niko Opper (born 1992), German footballer